The Journal of Social Studies Research is a quarterly peer-reviewed academic journal covering social studies. It is the official publication of The International Society for the Social Studies. The editor-in-chief is William B. Russell III (University of Central Florida).

Abstracting and indexing
The journal is abstracted and indexed in:
EBSCO databases
ERIC
ProQuest databases
Scopus

References

External links

The International Society for the Social Studies

Sociology journals
Elsevier academic journals
Quarterly journals
Publications established in 1977
English-language journals